Andrew Lumsden may refer to:

 Andrew Lumsden (bishop) (1654–1733), Bishop of Edinburgh 1727–1733
 Andrew Lumisden or Lumsden (1720–1801), Scottish Jacobite, private secretary to Prince Charles Edward Stuart and joint founder of the Royal Society of Edinburgh
 Andrew Lumsden (scientist) (born 1947), English neurobiologist
 Andrew Lumsden (choral director) (born 1962), British organist and choral director